The antimins (from the Greek , Antimension: "instead of the table"), is one of the most important furnishings of the altar in many Eastern Christian liturgical traditions. It is a rectangular piece of cloth of either linen or silk, typically decorated with representations of the Descent of Christ from the Cross, the Four Evangelists, and inscriptions related to the Passion. A small relic of a martyr is sewn into it. In the Latin Church of the Catholic Church, the altar stone, serves a similar function.

Syriac practice 
A wooden tablet, the ţablîtho, is the liturgical equivalent of the antimins in the churches of Syriac tradition.

See also
 Tabot
 Corporal (liturgy)
 Antependium
 Sthathicon

Further reading
Antimensium article in the Catholic Encyclopedia
Coptic Antimensium article in the Claremont Coptic Encyclopedia

Eucharistic objects
Christian religious objects
Altars
Eastern Christian liturgical objects
Descent from the Cross